Scott Bassett (born 9 October 1978) is a retired Australian rules footballer who played for the Port Adelaide Football Club and the Western Bulldogs in the Australian Football League, and Norwood in the South Australian National Football League.

Scott was one of the inaugural members of Port Adelaide's squad when they entered the AFL, as the team was allowed to select players from the SANFL for their starting team. He was drafted from the Norwood Football Club. He was drafted onto the rookie list for the club. He however did not play a match in the first two seasons on the Port Adelaide list, making his debut against Collingwood in Round 14, 1999, but did not play again in that year. At the end of the year, he was elevated off the rookie list, on to Port Adelaide's senior list. In the next 3 years on the Port Adelaide list, he played just the 14 games, spending much time in and out of the side.

He was delisted at the end of the 2002 AFL season, and nominated for the national AFL Draft, and was picked up by the Western Bulldogs at pick number 35 overall. He started the first seven games of the season in 2003, but was sidelined by a thigh injury, and later in the year returned to the VFL. He played a total of 15 games for the Bulldogs before returning to play for Norwood in the SANFL. He finished his AFL career playing a total of 30 games and scoring 3 goals.

He continued playing for Norwood in the SANFL. He is now the senior assistant coach for the Norwood Football Club.

References

External links
Western Bulldogs Past Player Profile
Port Adelaide Past Players List List of all PAFC past players, including games played and jumper number of Scott Bassett.

Australian rules footballers from South Australia
Norwood Football Club players
Port Adelaide Football Club players
Port Adelaide Football Club players (all competitions)
Western Bulldogs players
Living people
1978 births